Thomas Harrington was the Associate Deputy Director of the United States Federal Bureau of Investigation which is the number three position in the bureau.  He is a former Deputy Director of the Counterterrorism Division at the Federal Bureau of Investigation.

Harrington met with senior Defense Department investigators, and wrote letters, drawing the attention of the DoD to reports of serious crimes committed by military interrogators against the detainees held in extrajudicial detention at the Guantanamo Bay detainment camps, in Cuba.

See also

"Sergeant" Lacey
Donald Ryder

References

External link

Living people
Federal Bureau of Investigation executives
Year of birth missing (living people)